Togolese passports are issued to Togolese citizens to travel outside Togo. Togolese citizens can travel to member states of the Economic Community of West African States (ECOWAS) without a passport, national ID cards are sufficient.

Physical properties
 Surname
 Given names
 Nationality Togolese
 Date of birth 
 Sex  
 Place of birth  
 Date of Expiry 
 Passport number

Languages

The data page/information page is printed in French and English.

See also 
 ECOWAS passports
 List of passports
 Visa requirements for Togolese citizens

References

External links 
 Togolese Embassy in California
 Togolese Embassy in Washington, DC

Passports by country
Government of Togo